Marko Louis Janse van Rensburg (born ) is a South African rugby union player for the  in the Currie Cup and the Rugby Challenge. His regular position is hooker. He also plays for Rugby ATL of Major League Rugby (MLR).

He was a member of the  squad that won the 2018 Rugby Challenge, featuring in all eleven of their matches.

References

South African rugby union players
Living people
1991 births
People from Vanderbijlpark
Rugby union hookers
Boland Cavaliers players
Pumas (Currie Cup) players
Rugby union players from Gauteng
Lions (United Rugby Championship) players
Rugby ATL players
Cheetahs (rugby union) players
Free State Cheetahs players